Prinsenland is a neighborhood of Rotterdam, Netherlands.

It consists of many different types of housing (flats, apartments, row-houses) surrounding the large and green Prinsenpark. In the Prinsenpark there is a cemetery, skate park, and a lake, which contains the monument to the lowest point in the Netherlands, the Vierkant Eiland (Square Island). Unfortunately the lowest point in the Netherlands is not actually here, but a few kilometres away in Nieuwerkerk aan den IJssel.

References

Neighbourhoods of Rotterdam